Clifford Guy McIntire (May 4, 1908 – October 1, 1974) was a member of the US House of Representatives from Maine. He was born in Perham, Maine on May 4, 1908. After attending public schools, he was graduated from the University of Maine's College of Agriculture at Orono in 1930.

After graduating from college, he purchased a large farm, which he managed until 1952. McIntire worked in various roles for the Farm Credit Administration between 1933 and 1947, serving as an appraiser, supervisor, and regional manager. He became the assistant general manager of Maine Potato Growers, Inc., at Presque Isle, Maine from  1947 to 1951. McIntire was elected as a Republican to the Eighty-second Congress, by special election, October 22, 1951, to fill the vacancy caused by the death of Frank Fellows. He was reelected to the six succeeding Congresses and served from October 22, 1951, to January 3, 1965. McIntire voted in favor of the Civil Rights Acts of 1957, 1960, and 1964, as well as the 24th Amendment to the U.S. Constitution. He was not a candidate for reelection in 1964 but was instead an unsuccessful candidate for election to the Senate, losing to the popular Edmund Muskie by an overwhelming margin.

McIntire served as director of the American Farm Bureau Federation and was a member of Richard Nixon's Task Force on Rural Development between 1969 and 1970. He was appointed by President Gerald Ford in September 1974 to the newly created United States Railway Association. However, he died soon afterwards in Bangor, Maine, on October 1, 1974.

He was a father to a boy named Blynn Clifford McIntire

References

1908 births
1974 deaths
People from Aroostook County, Maine
University of Maine alumni
Farmers from Maine
Republican Party members of the United States House of Representatives from Maine
20th-century American businesspeople
20th-century American politicians